Roy Wilcox Airport  is a public use airport in Washington County, Alabama, United States. The airport is owned by the town of Chatom and located three nautical miles (6 km) east of its central business district.

Facilities and aircraft 
Roy Wilcox Airport covers an area of 40 acres (16 ha) at an elevation of 165 feet (50 m) above mean sea level. It has one runway designated 12/30 with an asphalt surface measuring 4,000 by 80 feet (1,219 x 24 m).

For the 12-month period ending July 11, 2012, the airport had 3,694 general aviation aircraft operations, an average of 10 per day. At that time there were 7 aircraft based at this airport: 86% single-engine and 14% multi-engine.

References

External links 
 Aerial image as of January 1998 from USGS The National Map
 

Airports in Alabama
Buildings and structures in Washington County, Alabama
Transportation in Washington County, Alabama